Evergestis frumentalis is a moth of the family Crambidae. It is found from the Iberian Peninsula through southern and central Europe and southern Fennoscandia to central Asia and southern Siberia. The species was first described by Carl Linnaeus in 1761.

The wingspan is 29–35 mm. There are two generations per year with adults on wing in April and August.

The larvae feed on Descourainia sophia, Sisymbrium, Sinapis (including S. arvensis) and Isatis (including I. tinctoria) species. The larvae of the second generation overwinter in a cocoon in the soil.

References

External links

Lepiforum.de
Moths and Butterflies of Europe and North Africa
 

Evergestis
Moths described in 1761
Moths of Asia
Moths of Europe
Taxa named by Carl Linnaeus